The areaWEB.COM Challenge was a golf tournament on the LPGA Tour played in August 1999 at Pleasant Valley Country Club in Sutton, Massachusetts. Mardi Lunn won the tournament by one stroke over Jan Stephenson.

References

External links
Results at golfobserver.com
Pleasant Valley Country Club

1999 in women's golf
August 1999 sports events in the United States
Former LPGA Tour events
Golf in Massachusetts
History of Worcester County, Massachusetts
Sutton, Massachusetts
Sports competitions in Massachusetts
Sports in Worcester County, Massachusetts
Tourist attractions in Worcester County, Massachusetts
History of women in Massachusetts